The 2022–23 Champions Hockey League was the eighth season of the Champions Hockey League, a European ice hockey tournament. The tournament is competed by 32 teams, with qualification being on sporting merits only. The six founding leagues will be represented by between three and five teams (based on a four-year league ranking), while seven "challenge leagues" will be to be represented by one team each.

Finnish team Tappara won their first Champions Hockey League title, defeating Swedish team Luleå HF 3–2 in the final. This made Tappara the second Finnish side to win the title. The title holders Rögle BK were defeated by Tappara in the quarterfinals with the total score 7–4.

American right winger Ryan Lasch from Swedish team Frölunda HC became the top scorer for the fifth time, scoring 22 points.

Team allocation
A total of 32 teams from different European first-tier leagues will participate in the 2022–23 Champions Hockey League. Besides the Continental Cup champions and wild card invitee Olimpija Ljubljana, 24 teams from the six founding leagues, as well as the national champions from Denmark, France, the United Kingdom, Norway, Poland, Slovakia and Slovenia will participate. Belarusian teams were not invited to participate due to the current political situation in Belarus while a Ukrainian team HC Donbass was forced to withdraw from the competition due to the ongoing Russian invasion of Ukraine and was replaced with the Slovenian champions Olimpija Ljubljana.

The qualification criteria for national leagues is based on the following rules:

 CHL champions
 National league champions (play-off winners)
 Regular season winners
 Regular season runners-up
 Regular season third-placed team
 Regular season fourth-placed team
 Regular season fifth-placed team

Note: the national league champions of the United Kingdom are determined following the regular season.

Teams
On 12 January 2022 it was decided that the 2021–22 season would not be accounted for in the league ranking and the status at the end of the 2019–20 season was taken into consideration to allocate places for the season.

Round and draw dates
The schedule of the competition is as follows.

Group stage

For the group stage, the teams were drawn into 8 groups of 4 teams. Each team will play home and away against every other team for a total of six games. The best two teams will qualify to the round of 16.

The draw of the group stage took place on 25 May 2022 in Tampere, Finland.

Pots
The participating teams were seeded into Pots 1 to 4 according to their achievements in their national leagues and their respective league’s standing in the CHL league ranking. The reigning CHL champions Rögle BK were the top seeded team and therefore given a place in pot 1. In the top pot there were also the reigning champions of the six founding leagues and the regular season winner of SHL. The 16 remaining teams from the founding leagues were placed to pots 2 and 3. The fourth pot included the playoff champions from the seven challenge leagues and MKS Cracovia, winners of 2021–22 IIHF Continental Cup.

Group A

Group B

Group C

Group D

Group E

Group F

Group G

Group H

Group stage tie-breaking criteria
Teams were ranked according to points (3 points for a win in regulation time, 2 poins for a win in overtime, 1 point for a loss in overtime, 0 points for a loss in regulation time). If two or more teams were tied on points, the following tiebreaking criteria were applied, in the order given, to determine the rankings (see 8.4.4. Tie breaking formula group stage standings):
Points in head-to-head matches among the tied teams;
Goal difference in head-to-head matches among the tied teams;
Goals scored in head-to-head matches among the tied teams;
The higher number of goals in one of the matches among the tied teams;
The most goals in the two game winning shot series;
If more than two teams are tied, head-to-head criteria 1, 2 and 3 are reapplied exclusively to this subset of teams;
If more than two teams are tied, and after applying head-to-head criteria 1, 2 and 3, a subset of teams are still tied, goal difference and goals scored then the results between each of the three teams and the closest best-ranked team outside the subset was applied; best-ranked team outside the sub-group was applied;
The higher position in the 2021–22 Champions Hockey League club ranking;
Goal difference in all group matches;
Goals scored in all group matches;
Regulation time wins in all group matches;
Overtime wins in all group matches;
Overtime losses in all group matches.

Playoffs

Qualified teams
The knockout phase involves the 16 teams which qualify as winners and runners-up of each of the eight groups in the group stage.

Format
In each round except the final, the teams play two games and the aggregate score decides which team advances. As a rule, the first leg is hosted by the team who has the inferior record in the tournament with the second leg being played on the home ice of the other team. If aggregate score is tied, a sudden death overtime follows. If the overtime is scoreless, the team who wins the shoot out competition advances.

The final will be played on the home ice of the team who has the better record in the tournament.

Bracket
The eight group winners and the eight second-placed teams advanced to the round of 16. The teams were divided into two seeding groups and group winners were randomly drawn against runners-up. Teams who had faced each other in the group stage could not be drawn against each other in the round of 16.

Round of 16
The draw for the entire playoff was held on 13 October 2022 in Zürich. The first legs were played on 15 and 16 November with return legs played on 22 and 23 November 2022.

|}

Quarter-finals
First legs were played on 6 and 7 December with return legs played on 13 December 2022.

|}

Semi-finals
First legs were played on 10 January with return legs played on 17 January 2023.

|}

Final

Statistics

Scoring leaders
The following players are leading the league in points.

Leading goaltenders
The following goaltenders are leading the league in save percentage, provided that they have played at least 40% of their team's minutes.

Awards

MVP
The winner of the LGT MVP Award was announced on 18 February 2023.

Team of the Season
The Team of the Season was announced on 23 February 2023.

References

 
2022
Champions